Talbot County is located in the heart of the Eastern Shore of Maryland in the U.S. state of Maryland. As of the 2020 census, the population was 37,526. Its county seat is Easton. The county was named for Lady Grace Talbot, the wife of Sir Robert Talbot, an Anglo-Irish statesman, and the sister of Lord Baltimore.

Talbot County comprises the Easton, MD Micropolitan Statistical Area, which is also included in the Washington–Baltimore–Arlington, DC–MD–VA–WV–PA Combined Statistical Area.

Talbot County is bordered by Queen Anne's County to the north, Caroline County to the east, Dorchester County to the south, and the Chesapeake Bay to the west.

History
 
The founding date of Talbot County is not known. It existed by February 12, 1661, when a writ was issued to its sheriff. It was initially divided into nine Hundreds and three parishes: St. Paul's, St. Peter's and St. Michael's.

In 1667, the first meeting of Commissions was held in the home known as Widow Winkles on the Skipton Creek near the town of York. The town of York was vacated once the courthouse was to be built on Armstrongs Old Field in 1709 near Pitts' Bridge. The new courthouse designated because York was too far north in the county once Queen Anne's County received their charter and was lopped off of Talbot County. Pitts' Bridge was just north of the Quaker Meeting House, but most importantly, it faced the Indian trail (Washington Street – Easton).

After the American Revolutionary War in 1786, Act to Assemble in Annapolis appointed John Needles to survey and "to erect a town in Talbot County to be called Talbottown"—laying out a town around then existing court house with 118 number parcels of land and designated streets, alleys and lanes. Talbottown was to be known as the county seat of Easton. Another act was passed in 1789 to build a larger courthouse on the site of the old one. This court house was completed in 1794 and today parts of it still stand today inside of the present court house.

Lt. Col. Tench Tilghman, Gen. George Washington's Aide-De-Camp, was born on Fausley in Talbot County on December 25, 1744. He died on April 18, 1786, and is buried in Oxford, Maryland. On the monument at the grave site, an inscription reads:
"Tench Tilghman Lt. Col. in the Continental Army And Aid de-camp of Washington Who spoke Him thus: He was in Every Action in which the Main Army was concerned a great part of the Time. He refused to receive Pay. While living no man could be more Esteemed and since dead none more Lamented than Col. Tilghman. No one had imbibed Sentiments of greater Friendship for Him than I had done. He left as Fair a Reputation as Ever belonged to a Human Character. Died April 18, 1786 Aged 42"

On his actual grave an inscription reads "In memory of Col. Tench Tilghman who died April 18, 1786 in the 42nd year of his age. Very much lamented. He took an early and active part in the great contest that secured the Independence of the United States of America. He was an Aide-de-Camp to His Excellency General George Washington Commander in Chief of the American Armies and was Honoured with his Friendship, Confidence and he was one of those whose merit were Disinguished and Honourable Reward By the Congress But Still more to his Praise He was a Good Man".

Founding Father John Dickinson was born in Trappe in 1732. The abolitionist Frederick Douglass was born into slavery near Tuckahoe Creek around 1817 or 1818.

The first established hospital on the Eastern Shore was near McDaniel at Dr. Absolom Thompson farm, the old Mary's Delight Farm.

The county has a number of properties on the National Register of Historic Places.

Historical sites and monuments

Third Haven Meeting House

The Third Haven Meeting House of Society of Friends was built in 1682 by Quakers. After Charles I was executed in England in 1649, then Virginia Governor Berkley, who sympathized with the Royalists, drove Quakers out of Virginia for their religious beliefs. Lord Baltimore invited the refugees to Maryland Province to settle, and passed the Toleration Act. John Edmondson gave the Quakers land on which to settle near the Tred Avon River in what later became the town now known as Easton, Maryland. The Meeting House sits on high ground surrounded by 3 wooded acres and is positioned along the Indian Trail (today known as Washington Street). George Fox, father of the Quaker movement visited several times. Upon his death, Third Haven Meeting House received his personal library and collection. The Third Haven Meeting House may be the oldest framed building for religious meeting in The United States. According to tradition, Lord Baltimore attended a sermon given there by William Penn.

In 1794, the rafters were extended on one side of the ridgepole. While this extension made more room inside the meeting house, it also made the building look lopsided, as seen in the photo. In 1879, a new Third Haven Meeting House was constructed out of brick, and remains in use today. The ground floor now contains meeting rooms, and the Sunday School is above.

St. Joseph Roman Catholic Church

St. Joseph Roman Catholic Church, which still holds weekly masses, is recognized as the oldest Roman Catholic Church on the Eastern Shore. Father Joseph Mosely, a Jesuit, established the church in 1765 on a farm north of Easton in Cordova. St. Joseph Church was the second Catholic Church in Talbot County; a chapel at Doncaster was the first. Father Mosley explained the foundation in a letter to his sister:
It's a Mission that ought to have been settled above these sixty years past by means of the immense trouble and excessive rides it hade given our gentlemen that lived next to it; till these days no one would undertake it, wither for want to resolution of fear of the trouble, notwithstanding it had contributed to the death of several of ours and had broken the constitution of everyone who went down to it; although it was but twice a year, except calls to the sick. I was deputed in August 1764 to settle a new place in the midst of this mission’ accordingly, I set off for those parts of the country; I examined the situation of every congregation within sixty miles of it; and, before the end of the year, I came across the very spot, as providence would have it, with land to be sold, nigh the center of the whole that was to be tended. I purchased the land, and took possession in March following.

The church had additions built in 1845 and in 1903 (the cloverleaf apse at the left where the altar is now). Father Mosley and other priest are buried under the church floor.

St. Joseph Church hosts an annual Jousting Tournament the first Wednesday of August. Bob Connolly of Easton said "the event has been at St. Joseph for the past 142 years. The only time the event was canceled was in 1918, due to many of the riders' involvement in World War I." Lewis Plugge a Cordova resident has jousted at St. Joseph for 40 years, and remembered going to Old St. Jose (locals call the church) and "loading up the horses in the back of a farm truck because we did not own a horse trailer." Jousting is also Maryland's official state sport.

Longwoods School House

Longwoods School House or The Little Red School House located on Longwoods Road (Route 662) just north of Easton. Longwoods School House is one of the few remaining one-room schoolhouses on the Eastern Shore. The school opened in 1865 with the average class size of about 30, and held its last class in 1967. Helen Collins once said "that she remembers going to school at the Little Red School House for primary school." She said, "I remember walking to school at the Little Red School House and after school my classmate and myself would walk to the store across the road and buy a pop." It once had two outhouses: one for the boys and one for the girls, separated by a fence. Indoor plumbing was introduced in 1957 and electricity in 1936.

The Talbot Historical Society restored the schoolhouse to it original form, removing the electrical lights and the modern plumbing and added the outhouse to the back of the building.

Poplar Island

Popeley Island (later Poplar Island) was one of Talbot County's first islands that was given and name and location on a map. Popeley Island was given its name by Captain William Claibourne after Lt. Richard Popeley. Popeley Island was the first land to be settled in 1632 by Captain William Claibourne. The first fields were planted in Talbot County on Popeley Island in 1634, and in 1635 Claibourne granted the whole island to his cousin Richard Thompson. The summer of 1637, while Thompson was off the island on an expedition, Native Americans, the Nanticoke tribe, massacred Thompson's whole family and workers. Through the 1700s the name changed spelling from Popeleys to Poples to Poplar. Thompson went back to Virginia and never came back to his island. Everyone forgot who Lt. Richard Popeley was, and the name Poplar Island stuck.  In 1654 Thomas Hawkins acquired the Poplar Island and sold half to Seth Foster, Tilghman Island founding father. Poplar Island is only accessible by boat today and is currently being rebuilt by the Army Corps of Engineers.

White Marsh Church

In 1691, King William and Queen Mary appointed Sir Lionel Copely as the first royal governor and told him that the colonists needed to become more religious. The Establishment Act, in 1692, divided Talbot County into three parishes to serve the Church of England, and Old White Marsh was one of them. The location of the church was to be in Hambleton, with the decision based upon the trade routine of the time. It was between the two ports in Oxford and Dover (small town on the Choptank near where Dover Bridge today sits).
The original church is believed to have been built between 1662 and 1665; however, the first mention of the church is in 1690, although the Talbot County Court House has a record of repair made to the road to Old White Marsh Church in 1687.

In 1751, repairs were made to the church, and it was doubled in size due to the fact the membership was so large. Reverend Thomas Bacon was the cause of the large membership. Reverend Bacon was the writer of the Bacon's Laws. Membership decreased when Reverend Bacon left to assume leadership of Maryland's largest parish (at that time), All Saints Church in Frederick, Maryland, and services alternated between White Marsh and the new Christ Church in the growing county seat at Easton. Services finally ended at White Marsh, and the church was abandoned after it burned in brush fire during a cleanup operation in 1897. A few of the original items used at the church rest at the St. Paul's Church in Trappe: White Marsh's Bible, communion items and the old wooden alms box. The remaining brick wall can still be seen from U.S. Route 50 between Trappe and Easton.

The first rector, Reverend Daniel Maynadier, and his wife are buried in the floor of the church. Robert Morris Sr., merchant and father of founding father Robert Morris, is buried just outside the church to the left. Plaques show the graves of all three individuals.

Talbot Boys monument 

From 1916 to 2022, a statue honoring the Talbot County men who fought in the Confederate States Army in the American Civil War stood in front of the Talbot County Courthouse. The statue is of a young boy holding and wrapped in a Confederate flag, and bears the inscription: "To the Talbot Boys · 1861–1865 · C.S.A.". Talbot County also had over 300 Union soldiers in the war, but there has never been a monument to them.

Like other Confederate monuments installed in the Jim Crow era, the monument drew increased opposition in the 21st century by those opposed to honoring the Confederacy and its defense of slavery. In 2015, the local N.A.A.C.P. chapter proposed removing the statue, but the County Council unanimously voted to keep it in place. In June 2020, a lengthy series of letters to the editor of The Talbot Spy, a local newspaper, was published, all arguing for the removal of the statue. In August 2020, after the George Floyd protests led to a new wave of removals of Confederate monuments, the County Council voted down 3:2 a resolution to remove the statue, triggering loud public protests. 

By 2021, the statue was the only remaining Confederate statue on public grounds in Maryland. In May 2021, the ACLU sued the county in federal court to demand its removal. In September 2021, the County Council voted 3:2 to remove the statue. It was removed on March 14, 2022, and relocated to the Cross Keys battlefield in Harrisonburg, Virginia, under the control of the nonprofit Shenandoah Valley Battlefields Foundation.

Frederick Douglass monument 
Near the Talbot Boys monument, a statue of the abolitionist Frederick Douglass, born into slavery near Tuckahoe Creek, stands in front of the courthouse.  Douglass had been held in the jail at the rear of the courthouse after his aborted attempt to escape slavery on April 2, 1836.

The Douglass statue was proposed by the Talbot Historical Society in 2002. The County Council approved it in 2004, after opposition by local veterans, with a majority of one vote. It did so on the condition that its height not exceed that of the Talbot Boys monument.

Old Wye Church 
A chapel of ease near the Wye River was likely built soon after the creation of Saint Paul's Parish (Centreville) by the act of establishment of 1692. The present brick church of Georgian design was built between 1717 and 1721 by  William Elbert. Altered in the mid-nineteenth century, the chapel was restored in Georgian Revival style in 1947-49 by the firm Perry, Shaw, and Hepburn (who also directed much of the early restoration of Colonial Williamsburg). The church is actively used today, one of two churches in Wye Parish. Old Wye Church (or Saint Luke's Church) is the oldest surviving brick church in Talbot County.

Politics and government
The Talbot County Council issued a proclamation on April 19, 1983, as to the birth of Talbot dating April 25, 1662. Talbot County was granted a charter form of government in 1973. The Talbot County Council has five members elected to four-year terms. The council president and vice president are elected yearly.  the current council president is Corey W. Pack (R). The current sheriff is Joe Gamble.

In 2020, Joe Biden became the first Democratic presidential nominee to carry Talbot County, since Lyndon Johnson's 1964 landslide and the second since Franklin Roosevelt in 1936. In the years following the Civil War, Talbot was a swing county, divided between unionists and secessionists, but, although it voted Democratic at every election between 1908 and 1924, it later took decisive steps towards the Republican Party, surpassing rock-ribbed Garrett as the state's "reddest" county during the 1976 election. Recent elections have seen the county trend a little more Democratic vis-à-vis elections from the 1970s and 1980s; however, before Biden's 2020 victory, only Barack Obama in 2008 had come within ten percentage points of reclaiming the county.

|}

Geography
It is the third-smallest county in Maryland by land area.

Adjacent counties
Queen Anne's County (north)
Dorchester County (south)
Calvert County (southwest)
Caroline County (east)
Anne Arundel County (west)

Major highways
U.S. Route 50 is the major highway serving Talbot County.

Rivers and creeks
Choptank River takes its name from a tribe of Algonquian-speaking Indians who inhabited both shores of this stream before its settlement by the English. They were people of large stature.

Miles River is a corruption of Saint Michael's River, its original name. In colonial times all grants of land from the Lords Baltimore were in the shape of leases subject to small and nominal ground rents, reserved by the Proprietary, and payable annually at Michaelmas, the Feast of St. Michael and All Angels. In the calendar of the Roman Catholic and Anglican churches this is observed on September 29. Because of this association, St. Michael was considered to be the patron saint of colonial Maryland, and as such was honored by the river being named for him. A large colony of Quakers were among the earliest settlers in Talbot County; as they had no reverence for saints, they persisted in dropping the word saint and calling the river Michaels River. It gradually became known as Miles.

As early as 1667, six years after the laying out of Talbot County, references to these names  are found in the Proceedings of the Provincial Council of Maryland. A commission was issued by Charles Calvert, Esq., Captain General of all the forces within the Province of Maryland, to George Richard as captain of 10 troops of horse to march out of "Choptanck and St. Miles rivers in Talbot County, aforesaid upon any expedition against any Indian enemy whatsoever," etc. At the same time, a similar commission was issued to Hopkin Davis, as Captain of foot in Choptanck and St. Miles rivers.

Wye River, which forms the northern boundary of Talbot County, was named by Edward Lloyd, a Welsh immigrant who took up large tracts of land along its southern shores before the laying out of Talbot County. He named it for the River Wye, noted for its sinuosity, whose source is near that of the River Severn, near a mountain in Wales. He named his homestead Wye House, which was owned by nine generations of Lloyds.

Tred Avon River is a corruption of "Third Haven", as the Third Haven Meeting House was built at the river's headwaters in 1682. "Third Haven" may be a corruption of "Thread Haven", an early name for the first port established at what is now Oxford, Maryland

Of the thirteen Eastons in England, the most important town of that name is situated about one mile (1.6 km) from the head of the Lower Avon. The seat of Talbot County, located one mile (1.6 km) from the headwaters of Tred Avon River, changed its name from Talbot Court House to Easton in 1788 following the American Revolutionary War, as a reference to the English town. In colonial days, many merchant vessels traded between Oxford and Bristol, England, near which Easton is located. Many of the early settlers of Talbot County emigrated from this area.

Demographics

2000 census
As of the census of 2000, there were 33,812 people, 14,307 households, and 9,628 families residing in the county. The population density was 126 people per square mile (49/km2). There were 16,500 housing units at an average density of 61 per square mile (24/km2). People self-identified as to racial or ethnic ancestry by the following: 81.98% White, 15.36% Black or African American, 0.18% Native American, 0.80% Asian, 0.13% Pacific Islander, 0.77% from other races, and 0.78% from two or more races. 1.82% of the population were Hispanic or Latino of any race. Of those who identified as white, 18.2% were of English, 15.5% German, 11.3% Irish and 11.1% American ancestry.

There were 14,307 households, out of which 26.40% had children under the age of 18 living with them, 54.40% were married couples living together, 9.80% had a female householder with no husband present, and 32.70% were non-families. 27.80% of all households were made up of individuals, and 13.00% had someone living alone who was 65 years of age or older. The average household size was 2.32 and the average family size was 2.82.

In the county, the population was spread out, with 21.70% under the age of 18, 5.60% from 18 to 24, 25.20% from 25 to 44, 27.20% from 45 to 64, and 20.40% who were 65 years of age or older. The median age was 43 years. For every 100 females there were 91.20 males. For every 100 females age 18 and over, there were 87.60 males.

The median income for a household in the county was $43,532, and the median income for a family was $53,214. Males had a median income of $33,757 versus $26,871 for females. The per capita income for the county was $28,164. About 5.30% of families and 8.30% of the population were below the poverty line, including 10.50% of those under age 18 and 7.90% of those age 65 or over.

2010 census
As of the 2010 United States Census, there were 37,782 people, 16,157 households, and 10,699 families residing in the county. The racial makeup of the county was 81.4% white, 12.8% black or African American, 1.2% Asian, 0.2% American Indian, 0.1% Pacific islander, 2.7% from other races, and 1.6% from two or more races. Those of Hispanic or Latino origin made up 5.5% of the population. In terms of ancestry, 21.7% were German, 18.8% were English, 18.2% were Irish, and 8.6% were American.

Of the 16,157 households, 25.7% had children under the age of 18 living with them, 52.2% were married couples living together, 10.1% had a female householder with no husband present, 33.8% were non-families, and 28.3% of all households were made up of individuals. The average household size was 2.31 and the average family size was 2.80. The median age was 47.4 years.

The median income for a household in the county was $63,017 and the median income for a family was $76,007. Males had a median income of $48,387 versus $38,627 for females. The per capita income for the county was $37,958. About 4.3% of families and 6.1% of the population were below the poverty line, including 8.7% of those under age 18 and 4.9% of those age 65 or over.

Education
Schools are part of the Talbot County Public Schools district.  There are also several private schools within the county.

Events
 Waterfowl Festival
 Talbot County Fair – Talbot County held the 1st Agricultural Fair in the State of Maryland in Easton in 1822.
 Tuckahoe Steam and Gas Association – Annual Steam Show – 1st Saturday after the 4th of July

Media
The newspaper of record is The Star Democrat. The county is located in Baltimore's Designated Market Area, but it isn't uncommon to get Salisbury and Washington, D.C. stations.

Communities

Towns
 Easton (county seat)
 Oxford
 Queen Anne (partly in Queen Anne's County)
 Saint Michaels
 Trappe

Ghost Towns
 Doncaster
 Dover
 York
 Wyetown

Census-designated places
The Census Bureau recognizes the following census-designated places in the county:
 Cordova
 Tilghman Island

Unincorporated communities

 Anchorage
 Bellevue
 Bozman
 Claiborne
 Copperville
 Doncaster
 Fairbanks
 Lewistown
 Lloyd Landing
 Matthews
 McDaniel
 Neavitt
 Newcomb
 Royal Oak
 Sherwood
 Tunis Mills
 Unionville
 Wittman
 Windy Hill
 Woodland
 Wye Mills

Notable people
 Frederick Douglass, orator, social reformer, former slave
 Robert Morris, Jr., signer of the Declaration of Independence; his father made his fortune in Oxford, Maryland
 Robert Henry Goldsborough
 Edward Lloyd, member of the Continental Congress
 Lucy Kennedy Miller, prominent American suffragist
 John Needles (1786–1878), Quaker abolitionist and a master craftsman of fine furniture
 Rev George Pickering (1769–1846), was, at his death, the oldest effective Methodist minister in the world born in Talbot County 
 Samuel Stevens, Jr. 18th Governor of Maryland, from 1822 to 1826
 Oswald Tilghman

See also
 National Register of Historic Places listings in Talbot County, Maryland

References

External links

 Talbot County government
 Local Information on Talbot County
 

 

 
Maryland counties
1661 establishments in Maryland
Populated places established in 1661
Maryland counties on the Chesapeake Bay